Group 1 of UEFA Euro 1980 began on 11 June 1980, and ended on 17 June 1980. The pool was made up of holders Czechoslovakia, West Germany, Netherlands, and Greece.

Teams

Standings

In the knockout stage,
The winner of Group 1, West Germany, advanced to play the winner of Group 2, Belgium, in the final.
The runner-up of Group 1, Czechoslovakia, advanced to play the runner-up of Group 2, Italy, in the third place play-off.

Matches

Czechoslovakia vs West Germany

Netherlands vs Greece

West Germany vs Netherlands

Greece vs Czechoslovakia

Netherlands vs Czechoslovakia

Greece vs West Germany

References

External links
UEFA Euro 1980 Group 1

Group 1
Czechoslovakia at UEFA Euro 1980
Greece at UEFA Euro 1980
Group
Group